Poula is an Angami-Pochuri language that is predominantly spoken by the Poumai Naga people in Senapati district in Manipur and Phek district in Nagaland, India. The language of Chingjaroi is also closely related to Poula.

Overview
A descriptive grammar of Poula is available now.

Grammar

Phonology
The phonology of Poula lacks syllable codas and also disallows consonant clusters in onset position. There are 25 consonant phonemes in Poula.

Consonants

Vowels
There are six vowel phonemes in Poula.

In Poula, the phoneme /ə/ is written with the grapheme 'ü' (now, many use it as 'ii') in Bible and Hymns which was devised by Bible Society of India. In addition Poula lacks high back round vowel [u] as a monophthong, but [u] is present in nexus of diphthong; for example pou [pəu] `father'.

Tones
Poula is a tonal language, however tone is not currently marked in the orthography. There are four tonemes in Poula.

Poula is an extremely innovative language–unlike Kuki-Chin languages–for having simple morphology.

Morphology
Nouns and verbs are the two content word classes. There are no ‘adjective’ and ‘adverbs’ words classes, however nominalized verbs may modify nouns and non-finite converbial verbs may modify verbs. There several functional words found.

References

Angami–Pochuri languages
Languages of Nagaland